Mesenchytraeus harrimani is an ice worm, named after E. H. Harriman. The worm was first discovered by an insect trapper on board Harriman's famous Arctic expedition, and was given the name by the entomologist Trevor Kincaid. Like other ice worms, it subsists on algae and pollen.

References

Enchytraeidae
Animals described in 1904